The 1981–82 season was the 44th season of competitive association football in the Football League played by Chester, an English club based in Chester, Cheshire.

Also, it was the seventh season spent in the Third Division after the promotion from the Fourth Division in 1975. Alongside competing in the Football League the club also participated in the FA Cup and the Football League Cup.

Football League

Results summary

Results by matchday

Matches

FA Cup

League Cup

Football League Group Cup

Season statistics

References

1981-82
English football clubs 1981–82 season